For the Summer and Winter Olympics, there are 46 venues that have been or will be used for ice hockey. The 46 venues are the most for any Winter Olympic sport. The first venue ice hockey took place in was indoor during the Summer Olympics in 1920. Twelve years later, ice hockey was held both indoors and outdoors. The plan was to have two of the twelve matches for those games played indoors, but thawing ice at the outdoor venue for those games forced four of the outdoor games to be moved indoors in 1932. Despite the success of indoor ice hockey venues at the 1932 Winter Olympics, it would be twenty years before another indoor venue would be used. Ice hockey would not be indoors entirely until the 1964 Games where they have remained as of the 2010 Winter Olympics. Both venues for the 2014 Winter Olympics are constructed to be indoors.

References

Venues
 
Ice hockey
Ice hockey